Simplicia inareolalis is a litter moth of the  family Erebidae. It is found in the Seychelles on Mahé and Silhouette islands.

In markings and general appearance this species resembles to Simplicia inflexalis but with the notable difference that it does not bear a trace of an areole.

References

Herminiinae
Moths described in 1912